Posterolateral sulcus can refer to:
 Posterolateral sulcus of medulla oblongata
Posterolateral sulcus of spinal cord